Luri is a commune of the Haute-Corse department of France on the island of Corsica.

Location

Luri is in the north of the Cap Corse peninsula.
It is crossed from west to east by the Luri, a stream that empties into the Tyrrhenian Sea.
Villages include Spergane, Luri, Campo and Santa Severa.

History
Luri has been tentatively identified as the Lurinum of Ptolemy both by similarity of name and because of Castellu di Luri, a Roman-style fortification occupied from the third century BC to the 1st century AD. It was in the territory of Ptolemy's tribe, Vanacini, who according to a bronze inscription recording a letter from the emperor Vespasian, had their own senate and magistrates and were therefore probably semi-autonomous. They may have occupied the fort themselves.

Population

See also

Tour de Sénèque
Communes of the Haute-Corse department

References

Communes of Haute-Corse
Haute-Corse communes articles needing translation from French Wikipedia